Gymnasura rhodina is a moth of the subfamily Arctiinae. It was described by Rothschild and Jordan in 1905. It is found in New Guinea.

References

 Natural History Museum Lepidoptera generic names catalog

Nudariina
Moths described in 1905
Moths of New Guinea